Alexej Ivanko  (born 12 March 1949) is a Slovak lawyer and former politician, who served as a member of the National Council  in 2002-2006. Ivanko was elected on the  originally elected on the Slovak Democratic and Christian Union – Democratic Party list, but left the party caucus  in 2005 to join the Free Forum party.

After retiring from politics in 2006, he has been active as a attorney and businessman. In 2022 the Slovak police accused Ivanko of being a part of a criminal network influencing court decisions in Eastern Slovakia. Ivanko refused the allegation.

References 

Slovak Democratic and Christian Union – Democratic Party politicians
Living people
1949 births
Members of the National Council (Slovakia) 2002-2006